Small Kana Extension is a Unicode block containing additional small variants for the Hiragana and Katakana syllabaries, in addition to those in the Hiragana, Katakana and Katakana Phonetic Extensions blocks.

Block

History
The following Unicode-related documents record the purpose and process of defining specific characters in the Small Kana Extension block:

See also 
 Hiragana (Unicode block)
 Katakana (Unicode block)
 Kana Extended-A (Unicode block)
 Kana Extended-B (Unicode block)
 Kana Supplement (Unicode block)

References 

Unicode blocks